Literary Death Match is a reading series co-created in 2006 by Todd Zuniga, Elizabeth Koch, and Dennis DiClaudio. Each event features four readers who read their own writing for seven minutes or less, and are then critiqued by three judges (often actors, comedians, authors, musicians or dancers) in the categories of literary merit, performance and intangibles. The winner is then decided by a literary-skewed, game show-type finale to decide who wins the Literary Death Match crown.

Locations
The Literary Death Match has occurred regularly in New York City, San Francisco and London, and has been produced in a total of 37 cities around the world, including Los Angeles, Chicago, Boston, Miami and Dallas in the United States, Calgary, Toronto and Montreal in Canada, as well as Dublin, Paris, Edinburgh, Beijing, Vilnius and Shanghai. On September 7, 2011, the event presented its 1,000th participant in Glasgow (Cargo Publishing's Allan Wilson).

United States
In the United States, the event has featured readers Tom Perrotta (author of Election, Little Children), Daniel Handler (a.k.a. Lemony Snicket) and The Believer editor Heidi Julavits and judges like Pulitzer Prize winners Richard Russo and Jennifer Egan, 24s Mary Lynn Rajskub, supermodel Paulina Porizkova, and the musician Moby.

Europe
In Europe, the event has featured readers Joe Dunthorne (author of Submarine), Esther Freud (Hideous Kinky), Nikesh Shukla (C4 Comedy Labs' Kabadasses creator), comedy writers David Quantick and Robert Popper, and judges Rich Fulcher (The Mighty Boosh), model-turned-author Sara J. Stockbridge, comedian Josie Long, Sichuan chef Fuchsia Dunlop, Kaiser Chiefs drummer Nick Hodgson and Irish musician Cathy Davey.

Accolades
In 2008, Literary Death Match was named "Best Scribbler Smackdown" by the San Francisco Bay Guardian "Best of the Bay" awards. In 2010, Interview said "Events like Literary Death Match are helping to revitalize the coolitude of the printed word."

History

References

External links
 Literary Death Match
 Litquake, San Francisco's Literary Festival

Social events
Literary societies
Recurring events established in 2006